The 2014–15 EHF Women's Cup Winners' Cup was the thirty-nine edition of the tournament that is organized by the European Handball Federation for the domestic cup winners in the continent.

Overview

Team allocation
The labels in the parentheses show how each team qualified for the place of its starting round:
TH: Title holders
CW: Cup winners
CR: Cup runners-up
2nd, 3rd, 4th, 5th, 6th, etc.: League position
ECL: Transferred from the EHF Champions League
GS: Fourth-placed teams from the group stage
QS: Losers from the qualification tournaments

Round and draw dates
All draws held at the European Handball Federation headquarters in Vienna, Austria.

Qualification stage

Round 2
Teams listed first played the first leg at home. Some teams agreed to play both matches in the same venue. Bolded teams qualified into the third round.

|}
Notes
a Both legs were hosted by Danilovgrad.

Round 3
Teams listed first played the first leg at home. Some teams agreed to play both matches in the same venue. Bolded teams qualified into last 16.

|}
Notes

a Both legs were hosted by Midtjylland.
b Both legs were hosted by SERCODAK Dalfsen.
c Both legs were hosted by Vistal Gdynia.
d Both legs were hosted by Siófok.

e Both legs were hosted by HCM Roman.
f Both legs were hosted by Atlético Guardés.
g Both legs were hosted by Fleury Loiret.

Knockout stage

Last 16

Seedings

Matches
Teams listed first played the first leg at home. Some teams agreed to play both matches in the same venue. Bolded teams qualified into quarter finals.

|}
Notes

a Both legs were hosted by Lokomotiva Zagreb.
b Both legs were hosted by Ferencváros.

c Both legs were hosted by Podravka Koprivnica.

Quarter-final
Teams listed first played the first leg at home. Some teams agreed to play both matches in the same venue. Bolded teams qualified into semi finals.

|}
Notes
a Both legs were hosted by Fleury Loiret.

Semi-finals
Teams listed first played the first leg at home. Some teams agreed to play both matches in the same venue. Bolded teams qualified into the Finals.

|}

Finals
Teams listed first played the first leg at home.

|}

See also
2014–15 Women's EHF Champions League
2014–15 Women's EHF Cup
2014–15 Women's EHF Challenge Cup

References

External links
Women's EHF Cup Winners' Cup (official website)

Women's EHF Cup Winners' Cup
EHF Cup Winners' Cup Women
EHF Cup Winners' Cup Women